The Billboard Latin Music Awards grew out of the Billboard Music Awards program from Billboard Magazine, an industry publication charting the sales and radio airplay success of musical recordings. Originally launched as the Billboard Latin Music Conference in 1990, the first awards began in 1994. In addition to awards given on the basis of success on the Billboard charts, the ceremony includes the Spirit of Hope award for humanitarian achievements and the Lifetime Achievement award, as well as awards by the broadcasting partner.

Since 1999, the awards ceremony has been broadcast on the television network Telemundo, where it became the network's highest-rated music special. The broadcast not only extends throughout the Americas and Puerto Rico, but also to such countries as Romania.

Hot Latin Songs of the Year

Hot Latin Song of the Year
"Aliado Del Tiempo" - Mariano Barba
"Down" - R.K.M & Ken-Y
"Mas Alla Del Sol" - Joan Sebastian
"Hips Don't Lie" - Shakira Featuring Wyclef Jean

Vocal Duet or Collaboration 
"Tengo Un Amor" - Toby Love Featuring R.K.M & Ken-Y
"Tu Recuerdo" - Ricky Martin Featuring La Mari
"Hips Don't Lie" - Shakira Featuring Wyclef Jean
"Noche De Sexo" - Wisin & Yandel Featuring Aventura

Artist of the Year 
Aventura
Daddy Yankee
R.K.M & Ken-Y
Wisin & Yandel

Latin Pop Albums

Male
"Amor" - Andrea Bocelli
"MTV Unplugged" - Ricky Martin
"Navidades" - Luis Miguel
"Trozos de Mi Alma, Vol. 2" - Marco Antonio Solís

Female
"Dos Amores Un Amante" - Ana Gabriel
"Ananda" - Paulina Rubio
"Limón y Sal" - Julieta Venegas
"La Voz de un Ángel" - Yuridia

Duo or Group
"Ayer Fue Kumbia Kings, Hoy Es Kumbia All Starz" - A.B. Quintanilla III Presents Kumbia All Starz
"Celestial" - RBD
"Live In Hollywood" - RBD
"En Presencia Del Futuro" - Voz A Voz

New Artist
"Así Soy Yo" - Anaís
"En Presencia Del Futuro" - Voz A Voz
"Habla El Corazón" - Yuridia
"La Voz de un Ángel" - Yuridia

Top Latin Albums Artist of the Year
Daddy Yankee
Don Omar
Maná
RBD

Latin Rock/Alternative Album of the Year
"Pafuera Telarañas" - Bebe
"Dulce Beat" - Belanova
"Pescado Original" - Los Enanitos Verdes
"Amar es Combatir" - Maná

Tropical Album of the Year

Male
"Decisión Unánime" - Víctor Manuelle
"Salsa Con Reggaeton" - Andy Montañez
"Directo Al Corazon" - Gilberto Santa Rosa
"Back To Da Barrio" - Michael Stuart

Female
"Libre" - Gisselle
"Pura Salsa" - La India
"Soy Diferente" - La India
"Soy Como Tu" - Olga Tañón

Duo or Group
"K.O.B. Live" - Aventura
"Arroz con Habichuela" - El Gran Combo de Puerto Rico
"Realtime" - Limi-T 21
"Haciendo Historia" - Xtreme

New Artist
"Corazon" - Fonseca
"Mi Sueño" - Marlon
"Trova Con Salsa Pa'l Bailador" - Sanabria

Regional Mexican Album of the Year

Male Solo Artist
"Enamorado" - Pepe Aguilar
"Vencedor" - Valentín Elizalde
"La Tragedia Del Vaquero" - Vicente Fernández
"Mas Alla Del Sol" - Joan Sebastian

Male Duo Or Group
"Crossroads: Cruce de Caminos" - Intocable
"Borron Y Cuenta Nueva" - Grupo Montéz de Durango
"Algo De Mi" - Conjunto Primavera
"Historias Que Contar" - Los Tigres del Norte

Female Group or Female Solo Artist
"Rancherisimas Con Banda" - Graciela Beltrán
"La Reina Canta A Mexico" - Ana Gabriel
"Desatados" - Los Horóscopos de Durango
"Orgullo De Mujer" - Alicia Villarreal

New Artist
"Aliado Del Tiempo" - Mariano Barba
"El Grupo Libra" - El Grupo Libra
"La Produccion Maestra 2006" - Banda Pequeños Musical
"Tierra Cali" - Tierra Cali

Latin Pop Airplay Song of the Year

Male
"A Ti" - Ricardo Arjona
"No Se Por Que" - Chayanne
"Te Mando Flores" - Fonseca
"Lo Que Me Gusta a Mí" - Juanes

Female
"Lo Que Son Las Cosas" - Anaís
"Volverte A Amar" - Alejandra Guzmán
"Como Duele (Barrera De Amor)" - Noelia
"Ni Una Sola Palabra" - Paulina Rubio

Duo or Group
"Labios Compartidos - Maná
"Tu Recuerdo" - Ricky Martin Featuring La Mari
"Hips Don't Lie" - Shakira Featuring Wyclef Jean
"Que Me Alcance La Vida" - Sin Bandera

New Artist
"Lo Que Son Las Cosas" - Anaís
"Abrazame" - Camila
"Te Mando Flores" - Fonseca
"Uno Y Uno Es Igual A Tres" - Jeremíasj

Tropical Airplay Song of the Year

Male
"Que Precio Tiene El Cielo" - Marc Anthony
"Nuestro Amor Se Ha Vuelto Ayer" - Víctor Manuelle
"Princesa" - Frank Reyes
"Vale La Pena" - Yoskar Sarante

Female
"Lo Que Son Las Cosas [salsa version]" - Anaís
"Lagrimas" - La India
"Solamente Una Noche" - La India
"Desilusioname" - Olga Tañón

Duo or Group
"Los Infieles" - Aventura
"Tengo Un Amor" - Toby Love Featuring R.K.M & Ken-Y
"No Es Una Novela" - Monchy & Alexandra
"Los Hombres Tienen La Culpa" - Gilberto Santa Rosa & Don Omar

New Artist
"Te Mando Flores" - Fonseca
"Ay Amor, Cuando Hablan Las Miradas" - Guayacan
"Tengo Un Amor" - Toby Love
"Usted Abuso" - Marlon

Regional Mexican Airplay Song of the Year

Male Solo Artist
"Aliado Del Tiempo" - Mariano Barba
"Para Que Regreses" - El Chapo de Sinaloa
"Que Lastima" - Alfredo Ramirez Corral
"Mas Alla Del Sol" - Joan Sebastian

Male Group
"De Rodillas Te Pido" - Alegres De La Sierra
"Te Compro" - Duelo
"Que Vuelva" - Grupo Montéz de Durango
"Algo De Mi" - Conjunto Primavera

Female Group or Female Solo Artist
"Mi Amor Por Ti" - Los Horóscopos de Durango
"Como Una Mariposa" - Diana Reyes
"Besos Y Copas" - Jenni Rivera
"De Contrabando" - Jenni Rivera

New Artist
"Aliado Del Tiempo" - Mariano Barba
"Masacre En El Cajoncito" - Los Nuevos Rebeldes
"Reencuentro" - Banda Pequeños Musical
"Que Lastima" - Alfredo Ramirez Corral

Latin Tour of the Year 
Vicente Fernández
Luis Miguel
RBD
Shakira

Reggaeton

Album of the Year
"Calle 13" - Calle 13
"King of Kings" - Don Omar
"Mas Flow: Los Benjamins" - Luny Tunes & Tainy
"Masterpiece" - R.K.M & Ken-Y

Song of the Year
"Machucando" - Daddy Yankee
"Down" - R.K.M & Ken-Y
"Caile" - Tito "El Bambino"
"Pam Pam" - Wisin & Yandel

Other Latin

Latin Ringtone of the Year
"Y Todo Para Que" - Intocable
"Labios Compartidos" - Maná
"Down" - R.K.M & Ken-Y
"Rakata" - Wisin & Yandel

Latin Dance Club Play Track of the Year
"Cha Cha (Dance Remixes)" - Chelo
"Just For One Night/Solamente Una Noche (Dance Remixes)" - La India
"Mas Que Nada (Dance Remixes)" - Sérgio Mendes Featuring The Black Eyed Peas
"Un Alma Sentenciada (Dance Remixes)" - Thalía

Latin Rap/Hip-Hop Album of the Year
"E.S.L." - Akwid
"Still Kickin' It" - Akwid & Jae-P
"Pa Mi Raza" - Jae-P
"Toby Love" - Toby Love

Latin Greatest Hits Album of the Year
"Sigo Siendo Yo" - Marc Anthony
"30 Recuerdos" - Los Bukis
"Amor Eterno: Los Exitos" - Rocío Dúrcal
"La Historia Del Divo" - Juan Gabriel

Latin Compilation Album of the Year
"Now Latino" - Various Artists
"Now Latino 2" - Various Artists
"Roc-La-Familia And Héctor el Father Present: Los Rompediscotekas" - Various Artists
"WY Records Presents: Los Vaqueros" - Various Artists

Latin Jazz Album of the Year
Around The City'' - Eliane EliasSolo - Gonzalo RubalcabaDances, Prayers, and Meditations For Peace'' - Nestor Torres

Latin Christian/Gospel Album of the Year
"The Shadow Of Your Wings: Hymns And Sacred Songs" - Fernando Ortega
"Dismiss The Mystery" - Salvador
"On My Knees: The Best Of Jaci Velasquez" - Jaci Velasquez
"Alegria" - Marcos Witt

Songwriter of the Year
Mariano Barba
Anthony "Romeo" Santos
Joan Sebastian
Marco Antonio Solís
Anthony López

Producer of the Year
Armando Avila
Cachorro Lopez
Luny Tunes
Nely

Production and Labels

Publisher of the Year
EMI April, ASCAP
EMI Blackwood, BMI
Sony/ATV Discos, ASCAP
Universal-Musica Unica, BMI

Publishing Corporation of the Year
EMI Music Publishing
Sony/ATV Music Publishing
Universal Music Publishing
Warner/Chappell Music Publishing

Hot Latin Songs Label of the Year
EMI Televisa
Machete
Sony BMG Norte
Universal Latino

Top Latin Albums Label of the Year
EMI Televisa
Machete
Sony BMG Norte
Univision Music Group

Latin Pop Airplay Label of the Year
EMI Televisa
Sony BMG Norte
Universal Latino
Warner Latina

Tropical Airplay Label of the Year
J&N
Machete
Sony BMG Norte
Univision

Regional Mexican Airplay Label of the Year
Disa
Fonovisa
Universal Latino
Univision

Latin Rhythm Airplay Label of the Year: (new category)
Machete
Sony BMG Norte
Universal Latino
Univision

Latin Pop Albums Label of the Year
Sony BMG Norte

Tropical Albums Label of the Year
Sony BMG Norte

Regional Mexican Albums Label of the Year
Univision Music Group

Latin Rhythm Albums Label of the Year
Machete

Billboard Lifetime achievement award
Miguel Bosé

References 

Billboard.com: 2007 Latin Billboard Music Awards winners
Billboard.com" Performers set for 2007 Billboard Latin awards

Billboard Latin Music Awards
Latin Billboard Music Awards
Latin Billboard Music Awards
Billboard Music Awards
Latin Billboard Music